Johannes Paulus Bothma (born 28 March 1988) is a South African cricketer who currently plays for Western Province and the Cape Cobras. He is a right-handed batsman and right-arm fast bowler. Bothma started his career with Boland and made his first-class debut on 15 February 2007 against Western Province.

Bothma has also played club cricket in England with Colne of the Lancashire League, Whiston Parish Church Cricket Club, and Wolverhampton in the Birmingham Premier League.

References
 profile at CricketArchive

1988 births
Living people
Cricketers from Bellville, South Africa
South African cricketers
Boland cricketers
Cape Cobras cricketers
Western Province cricketers